{{DISPLAYTITLE:C18H26O}}
The molecular formula C18H26O (molar mass: 258.40 g/mol, exact mass: 258.1984 u) may refer to:

 Galaxolide (HHCB)
 Xibornol